Lee In-gyu (born 16 January 2000) is a Korean footballer currently playing as a forward for Hwaseong FC of K3 League on loan from FC Seoul.

Career statistics

Club

Notes

References

External links
 

2000 births
Living people
People from Gwangmyeong
South Korean footballers
South Korea youth international footballers
Association football forwards
K League 1 players
K3 League players
FC Seoul players
Hwaseong FC players